The Kirkwood Historic District, in the Kirkwood neighborhood of Atlanta, Georgia, is a large historic district which was listed on the National Register of Historic Places in 2009.

It includes the Kirkwood School (1906), designed by Bruce, Everett and Hayes, which was already separately listed on the National Register.

The district is roughly bounded by Memorial Dr., Montgomery St., Hosea Williams Dr., Rogers St., CSX RR., & city limits.

It includes Queen Anne, Colonial Revival, and Classical Revival architecture, and includes residential and commercial and government buildings.

Historic subfunction: Single Dwelling; Multiple Dwelling; Specialty Store; Restaurant; Meeting Hall; Post Office; School

References

National Register of Historic Places in DeKalb County, Georgia
Queen Anne architecture in Georgia (U.S. state)
Colonial Revival architecture in Georgia (U.S. state)
Buildings and structures completed in 1870